Defending champion Roger Federer defeated Rafael Nadal in the final, 6–3, 5–7, 6–3 to win the singles tennis title at the 2015 Swiss Indoors. This was Federer's tenth consecutive final at the event.

Seeds

Draw

Finals

Top half

Bottom half

Qualifying

Seeds
{{columns-list|colwidth=30em|
  Adrian Mannarino (qualified)
  Albert Ramos-Viñolas (first round)
  Robin Haase (qualified)
  Jerzy Janowicz (qualified)
  Denis Kudla (qualifying competition, lucky loser)
  Nikoloz Basilashvili (first round)
  Benjamin Becker (qualifying competition)
  Dušan Lajović (qualified)
}}

Qualifiers

Lucky losers
  Denis Kudla'''

Qualifying draw

First qualifier

Second qualifier

Third qualifier

Fourth qualifier

References
 Main Draw
 Qualifying Draw

Swiss Indoors – Singles
2015 Davidoff Swiss Indoors